Thomas M. Hannigan (May 30, 1940 – October 9, 2018) was an American businessman and politician.

Biography
Hannigan was born in Vallejo, California. He served in the United States Marine Corps from 1963 to 1966 and was commissioned a captain. In 1962, he graduated from Santa Clara University. He moved to Fairfield, California and was in the real estate business. He served on the Fairfield City Council rom 1970 to 1974 and as mayor of Fairfield from 1972 to 1974. Hannigan also served on the Solano County Board of Supervisors from 1974 to 1978 and served as chair of the board of supervisors. Hannigan served in the California State Assembly from December 4, 1978 - November 30, 1996 and was a Democrat. From 1999 to 2003, Hannigan served as the director of the California Department of Water Resources.

The Fairfield–Vacaville station is named in his honor.

Hannigan's daughter, Erin Hannigan Andrews, is the Supervisor of Solano County.

References

External links
Join California Thomas M. Hannigan

1940 births
2018 deaths
People from Fairfield, California
Politicians from Vallejo, California
Military personnel from Vallejo, California
Santa Clara University alumni
Businesspeople from California
County supervisors in California
California city council members
Mayors of places in California
Democratic Party members of the California State Assembly
20th-century American businesspeople
20th-century American politicians
United States Marine Corps personnel of the Vietnam War